Douglas T. Richert (born June 14, 1960) is an American stock car racing crew chief, who is currently a crew chief for Hattori Racing Enterprises in the NASCAR Xfinity Series.

Career
Richert is best known for winning the Cup championship with Dale Earnhardt in 1980. He started out working for Rod Osterlund as a 16-year-old in 1976. Richert had gone to High School in San Jose with Osterlund's daughter who dated one of his friends, who was interested in racing. Doug got interested in building dirt cars because his friends were, and one thing lead to another. In late 1976 he got the chance to move east with Roland Wlodyka who was forming a Cup team, initially living in a trailer on the property at Charlotte Motor Speedway. Osterlund bought the team in late 1977, and campaigned it with Dave Marcis in 1978, followed by Dale Earnhardt who went on to win the NASCAR Winston Cup Rookie of the Year in 1979. In May 1980, Crew Chief Jake Elder left the team, and Richert who was still 19, replaced him. Richert may have inherited the job in the beginning, but he earned it fair and square when he went on to win the Championship with Earnhardt. Midway through 1981 Osterlund sold his team to J.D. Stacy, and Earnhardt moved to Richard Childress Racing taking Richert with him. At the end of 1981 Doug left to take a position with Junior Johnson. From 1984 to 1986 Richert was the Crew Chief for Neil Bonnett in the No. 12 Budweiser car.

Richert is also the former full-time crew chief for the No. 15 Ford Mustang driven by rookie Timmy Hill and run by Rick Ware Racing in the Nationwide Series.  In Cup, he has also been a crew chief for Brian Vickers, Robby Gordon and three seasons with Greg Biffle helping him earn 10 wins.  In the NASCAR Camping World Truck Series, Richert served as crew chief for three-time champion Ron Hornaday Jr. and 2003 Rookie of the Year Carl Edwards.

Richert joined BK Racing in 2013, and midway through the season replaced Pat Tryson as crew chief for the team's No. 83 car; at the end of the season he was promoted to the team's director of research and development.

Richert left BK Racing before the 2018 season, and became the crew chief for the No. 78 Mason Mitchell Motorsports team in the ARCA Series. However, MMM shut down mid-year, leaving him without a job until he quickly reunited with Max Tullman (one of the drivers he crew chiefed in ARCA that year) after he started his own new Xfinity team, Tullman-Walker Racing. Richert and Tullman went to Carl Long's MBM Motorsports team in 2019, and there he crew chiefed Tullman in the races he ran with them along with some other drivers as well.

References

External links
 

Living people
Sportspeople from California
NASCAR crew chiefs
1960 births